Put Yourself in My Shoes is the second studio album by American country music singer-songwriter Clint Black, released on November 27, 1990. As with Black's debut album Killin' Time, the album is currently certified triple platinum by the RIAA. All four singles from the album produced huge hits for Black on the Billboard Hot Country Singles & Tracks charts: "Loving Blind" and "Where Are You Now" both at Number One; the title track at #4; and "One More Payment" at #7. "This Nightlife" also charted at #61 from unsolicited airplay.

Track listing

Personnel

Clint Black's band
Clint Black – acoustic guitar and electric guitars, harmonica, lead vocals
Dick Gay – drums and percussion
Jeff Huskins – fiddle, keyboards, backing vocals
Hayden Nicholas – acoustic guitar, electric guitar, backing vocals
Jeff Peterson – pedal steel guitar, resonator guitar, backing vocals
Jake Willemain – bass guitar, backing vocals
Martin Young – acoustic guitar, backing vocals

Additional musicians 
Michael Black – backing vocals
Jana King – backing vocals
Randy McCormick – backing vocals
Brent Rowan – electric guitar
Curtis Young – backing vocals

Chart performance

Weekly charts

Year-end charts

Singles

Other charted songs

References 

Put Yourself in My Shoes [CD liner notes]. 1990. RCA Records.
[ Artist Chart History (Singles)]. Billboard. Retrieved on January 1, 2007.
[ Artist Chart History (Albums)]. Billboard. Retrieved on January 1, 2007.

1990 albums
Clint Black albums
RCA Records albums
Albums produced by James Stroud